Crambus occidentalis is a moth in the family Crambidae. It was described by Augustus Radcliffe Grote in 1880. It is found in North America, where it has been recorded from Alberta and California.

References

Crambini
Moths described in 1880
Moths of North America